996 Hilaritas is a Themistian asteroid. It was discovered in 1923 by Austrian astronomer Johann Palisa. Following Palisa's death in 1925, this asteroid was named for a "happy or contented mind"; qualities associated with the discoverer.

Photometric observations of this asteroid collected during 2010 show a rotation period of 10.052 ± 0.001 hours with a brightness variation of 0.65 ± 0.03 magnitude.

References

External links 
 
 

000996
Discoveries by Johann Palisa
Named minor planets
000996
19230321